Hebert Carlos Revetria Acevedo (born 27 August 1955) known simply as Revetria, is a Uruguayan former footballer.

Career
Revetria began playing football with Club Nacional de Football. He is known for his hat-trick, in the finals of the Campeonato Mineiro in 1977, against Atlético Mineiro with Cruzeiro EC.

Revetria made several appearances for the Uruguay national football team, seven before he was age 21, and played in the 1975 Copa América.

Now retired, he works at Tenfield.

Personal
Revetria's son, Nathaniel, is also a professional footballer.

References

External links

1955 births
Living people
Uruguayan footballers
Uruguayan expatriate footballers
Uruguay international footballers
Uruguayan Primera División players
Liga MX players
Club Nacional de Football players
Cruzeiro Esporte Clube players
Tecos F.C. footballers
Tampico Madero F.C. footballers
Peñarol players
Colo-Colo footballers
Cobreloa footballers
Club Atlético River Plate (Montevideo) players
Deportes Tolima footballers
Expatriate footballers in Brazil
Expatriate footballers in Chile
Expatriate footballers in Mexico
Association football midfielders